The Yères is a river of Normandy, France,  in length, flowing through the department of Seine-Maritime.

Geography 
The river's source is in the forest of Eu, just south of the village of Aubermesnil-aux-Érables. Its course takes a northerly route past Foucarmont and Fallencourt. It then turns northwestward and passes through the communes of Grandcourt, Villy-sur-Yères, Sept-Meules, Cuverville-sur-Yères, Saint-Martin-le-Gaillard, Touffreville-sur-Eu and finally through Criel-sur-Mer to the sea.

Like most other rivers in the region, the Yères is classified as a first class river, offering anglers the chance to catch trout and lampreys, but not salmon.

See also 
French water management scheme

References

Rivers of France
Rivers of Normandy
Rivers of Seine-Maritime
0Yeres